was a Japanese woodworker and lacquerware artist. He was nominated a Living National Treasure in 1970.

He received a commission to create the doorknob bases for the Take-no-Ma audience room in the new Tokyo Imperial Palace. The bases are 52cm in diameter and decorated with “raden”, in which shell or pieces of precious metals are set. On the inner side pearl oyster from Japan were used, while on the outer side Mexican shells were set. The hall also features works by Heihachirō Fukuda and Hajime Katō.

See also 
 Seison Maeda (1885–1977), one of the leading Nihonga painters
 List of Nihonga painters

References 

1904 births
1982 deaths
Living National Treasures of Japan
Artists from Kyoto Prefecture
Japanese woodworkers
Mingei
20th-century Japanese people